Pavel Širuček (born 20 November 1992) is a Czech table tennis player. He competed in the 2020 Summer Olympics for Czech Republic.

References

1992 births
Living people
Czech male table tennis players